John L. Pickitt (July 30, 1933 – March 14, 2020) was a lieutenant general in the United States Air Force who served as director of the Defense Nuclear Agency from 1985 to 1987. He attended the United States Military Academy. He died in 2020 in Charlotte, North Carolina.

References

1933 births
2020 deaths
People from Freestone County, Texas
Military personnel from Texas
United States Military Academy alumni
United States Air Force generals